AP-1 complex subunit gamma-like 2 is a protein that in humans is encoded by the AP1G2 gene.

Adaptins are important components of clathrin-coated vesicles transporting ligand-receptor complexes from the plasma membrane or from the trans-Golgi network to lysosomes. The adaptin family of proteins is composed of four classes of molecules named alpha, beta-, beta prime- and gamma- adaptins. Adaptins, together with medium and small subunits, form a heterotetrameric complex called an adaptor, whose role is to promote the formation of clathrin-coated pits and vesicles. The protein encoded by this gene is a gamma-adaptin protein and it belongs to the adaptor complexes large subunits family. This protein along with the complex is thought to function at some trafficking step in the complex pathways between the trans-Golgi network and the cell surface. There are two alternatively spliced transcript variants of this gene encoding the same protein.

Interactions
AP1G2 has been shown to interact with NEDD4.

References

External links

Further reading